The following is a list of aircraft of the Icelandic Coast Guard, past and present. The Icelandic Coast Guard has operated 22 aircraft since the inception of its air wing, as well as having leased commercial aircraft on occasion for short-term missions, with their history being widely covered in the Icelandic media through the years.

Airplane history

Helicopter history

Notes

References

Icelandic Coast Guard